Hafiz Hussain Ahmed is a Pakistani senior politician and Islamic scholar who served two times as member of the National Assembly of Pakistan from 2002 - 2007 and 1988 - 1990 and also Member of the Senate of Pakistan from March 1991 to March 1994.

Early life and education
Hussain Ahmed was born in 1951 in a religious family of Quetta. He got his education in Arabic, Islamic literature, Quran, Hadith and Fiqh in early childhood. He is a Deobandi. He is also the holder of traditional Dars-i Nizami and Sanad in Hafiz-e-Quran.

Political career
In early 1973 Ahmed started his political career from Balochistan at the provisional level and then at the national level, Thereafter he led important positions in Jamiat-e-Ulema-e-Islam and Pakistan National Alliance, and has also been Deputy Parliamentary Leader in the National Assembly.

References

1951 births
Living people
Pakistani Islamic religious leaders
Pakistani MNAs 2002–2007
Jamiat Ulema-e-Islam politicians
Pakistani Sunni Muslim scholars of Islam
People from Quetta District
Pakistani MNAs 1988–1990
Members of the Senate of Pakistan